The Canadian national futsal team is a futsal team that represents Canada at international competitions. It is controlled by the Canadian Soccer Association and affiliated with CONCACAF. Their first FIFA sanctioned international was played in 's-Hertogenbosch, Netherlands at the 1989 FIFA Futsal World Cup against Argentina. The match resulted in a 3–1 loss. The team is coached by Kyt Selaidopoulos and their most recent tournament was the 2021 CONCACAF Futsal Championship.

Tournaments entered

Current squad
The following 20 players have been called up for a camp in Montréal, Quebec from November 30 to December 5, 2022.

See also

 Futsal Canadian Championship
 Canada men's national soccer team
 Soccer in Canada

Notes

References

Futsal in Canada
Canada
Futsal